The 1987 Davidson Wildcats football team represented Davidson College as a member of the Colonial League during the 1987 NCAA Division I-AA football season. Led by third-year head coach Vic Gatto, the Wildcats compiled an overall record of 1–10 with a mark of 0–3 in conference play, placing last out of six teams in the Colonial.

Schedule

References

Davidson
Davidson Wildcats football seasons
Davidson Wildcats football